Öhlund is a surname. Notable people with the surname include:

Göran Öhlund (born 1942), Swedish orienteering competitor
Gunnar Öhlund (born 1947), Swedish orienteering competitor
Mattias Öhlund (born 1976), Swedish professional ice hockey defenceman